Prionopelta is a genus of ants in the subfamily Amblyoponinae. Of its 15 species, four are known from Africa, five from the Americas and six from the Indo-Pacific region.

Species

Prionopelta aethiopica Arnold, 1949
Prionopelta amabilis Borgmeier, 1949
Prionopelta amieti Terron, 1974
Prionopelta antillana Forel, 1909
Prionopelta brocha Wilson, 1958
Prionopelta descarpentriesi Santschi, 1924
Prionopelta humicola Terron, 1974
Prionopelta kraepelini Forel, 1905
Prionopelta majuscula Emery, 1897
Prionopelta marthae Forel, 1909
Prionopelta media Shattuck, 2008
Prionopelta modesta Forel, 1909
Prionopelta opaca Emery, 1897
Prionopelta punctulata Mayr, 1866
Prionopelta robynmae Shattuck, 2008

References

External links

Amblyoponinae
Ant genera